The European Youth Card (also known as EURO<26) allows reductions on cultural activities, shops, transport, eating out and accommodation, and can be used in 38 European countries. Most countries make it possible to buy and use the card up to the age of 30.  The card is usually issued for one year.

In many European countries the card is still known as EURO<26, but with the change of the age limit (from 26 to 30), increasingly it is called the European Youth Card (in English or the local language: Jugendkarte, Carta Giovani, Carnet Joven).

The European Youth Card is issued in three versions: a classic card, a student card, or a so-called co-brand card. The co-branded card can be issued with various partners -  a bank, a railway company, a municipality or a local government, a cultural institution or other. The design of the co-branded card can be very different from the classic card, however, it always carries the EYCA logo and offers the same benefits as the classic card.

European Youth Card is managed by the European Youth Card Association (EYCA) that represents 40 Youth Card organisations in 38 countries. All EYCA Member organisations issue the European Youth Card in their territory and develop local discounts individually. The main EYCA has its official seat in the Netherlands and its office in Bratislava, Slovakia.

The European Youth Card can be purchased through the national card organisation. Young people coming from outside of Europe, or living in a country where there is no national card organisation, have the possibility to buy the card online through the Kiosk shop that is managed by the EYCA headquarters.

The cardholders have the possibility to search all the 80,000 discounts on the online geo-tagged map on the card's official web site. Moreover, EYCA has recently launched an iOS application called  GeoDiscounts that is designed to help cardholders when traveling with the European Youth Card. Thanks to the GPS it shows the user a number of EYCA discounts closest to their current location. It is possible to narrow down the search by choosing a category, or typing in keywords. When the users have found the discount(s) they were looking for, they can access detailed information as well as the exact location on a map. Alternatively they can call or e-mail the place for more information.

References

External links
 Official website
 GeoDiscounts
 Kiosk shop

Tourism in Europe
Customer loyalty programs
Youth in Europe